The Roman Catholic Diocese of Comayagua is a Latin suffragan bishopric in the ecclesiastical province of the Archdiocese of Tegucigalpa. The present diocese, erected 13 March 1963, revives a larger colonial bishopric.

Its present cathedral episcopal see is the Catedral de la Inmaculada Concepción, devoted to the Immaculate Concepcion, in Comayagua, which city also has the former cathedral: Iglesia de La Merced Iglesia de La Merced, devoted to Our Lady of Mercy.

History 
In 1561, the first bishopric was established as Diocese of Comayagua, on territory split off from the then Roman Catholic Diocese of Trujillo (founded as diocese of Honduras), and in 1571 gained its mother bishopric's remaining territory at its suppression (Trujillo would however be restored in 1987).
 
Like many missionary dioceses, it had mainly regular priests as Ordinaries, who generally died in office or were transferred/promoted within the vast Spanish colonial empire.

On 1916.02.02 it was suppressed, its territory being divided to establish the Archdiocese of Tegucigalpa (its Metropolitan still, in the national capital), the then Apostolic Vicariate of San Pedro Sula and the Diocese of Santa Rosa de Copán.

It was restored on 1963.03.13, as Diocese of Comayagua, on much smaller territory (7,527 km2) split off from its Metropolitan, the Archdiocese of Tegucigalpa.

Statistics 
As per 2014, it has a population of 635,586 Catholics (93.3% of 681,546 total), pastorally served in 32 parishes by 56 priests (46 diocesan, 10 religious), 102 lay religious (33 brothers, 69 sisters) and 30 seminarians.

Ordinaries

Bishops of Comayagua (1531–1916) 
 Alfonso de Talavera, OSH (1531–1540)
 Cristóbal de Pedraza (1539–1553)
 Jerónimo de Corella, OSH (1556–1575)
 Alfonso de la Cerda, OP (1578–1587), appointed Bishop of La Plata o Charcas
 Gaspar de Andrada, OFM (1587–1612)
 Alfonso del Galdo, OP (1612–1628)
 Luis de Cañizares, OFM (1628–1645)
 Juan Merlo de la Fuente (1650–1656)
 Martín de Espinosa y Monzón (1672–1676)
 Ildefonso Vargas y Abarca, OSA (1678–1699)
 Pedro Reyes de los Ríos de Lamadrid, OSB (1699–1700), appointed Bishop of Yucatán (Mérida) 
 Juan Pérez Carpintero, OPraem (1701–1724)
 Antonio López Portillo de Guadalupe, OFM (1725–1742)
 Francisco de Molina, OSBas (1743–1749)
 Diego Rodríguez de Rivas y Velasco (1751–1762), appointed Bishop of Guadalajara, Jalisco, Mexico
 Isidro Rodríguez Lorenzo, OSBas (1764–1767), appointed Archbishop of Santo Domingo
 Antonio Macarulla Minguilla de Aguilain (1767–1772), appointed Bishop of Durango
 Francisco José de Palencia (1773–1775)
 Francisco Antonio Iglesia Cajiga, OSH (1777–1783), appointed Bishop of Michoacán
 José Antonio de Isabela (1785–1785)
 Fernando Cardiñanos, OFM (1788–1794)
 Vicente Navas, OP (1795–1809)
 Manuel Julián Rodríguez del Barranco (1817–1819)
 Francisco de Paula Campo y Pérez (1844–1853)
 Hipólito Casiano Flórez (1854–1857)
 Juan Félix de Jesús Zepeda (1861–1885)
 Manuel Francisco Vélez (1887–1901)
 José María Martínez y Cabañas (1902 – 2 February 1916), appointed Archbishop of Tegucigalpa

Bishops of Comayagua (1963–present) 
 Bernardino N. Mazzarella, OFM (13 March 1963 – 30 May 1979)
 Geraldo Scarpone Caporale, OFM (30 May 1979 – 21 May 2004)
 Robert Camilleri Azzopardi, OFM (21 May 2004 – present)

Coadjutor bishop
Geraldo Daniel Joseph Scarpone Caporale, O.F.M. (1979)

See also 
 List of Catholic dioceses in Honduras

Sources and external links 
 GCatholic, with Google map & satellite photo - data for all sections
 

Specific

Roman Catholic dioceses in Honduras
Former Roman Catholic dioceses in America
Comayagua
Roman Catholic dioceses and prelatures established in the 20th century
Religious organizations established in 1963
Roman Catholic Ecclesiastical Province of Tegucigalpa